Television X (TVX) is a series of adult pay-per-view television channels in the United Kingdom owned by MG Global Entertainment (Europe) Limited. Until 2020, it was owned by Portland TV which was a subsidiary of Richard Desmond's publishing company Northern & Shell until 2016. All of the programmes on the main Television X channel are filmed and produced in the United Kingdom.

It was also known as Television X – The Fantasy Channel for a long time, although it has since dropped that name. It was originally to be called TVX until Desmond was advised that that name was already in use so 'The Fantasy Channel' was added. Television X is also known by the abbreviation TVX.

History
Television X started broadcasting under its original name – The Fantasy Channel, in June 1995. The two original hosts were Charmaine Sinclair and Samantha Jessup (with Debbie Corrigan and Kirsten Imrie) making occasional appearances. Much of the original programming Superdick, Shagnasty and Mutley, David Dickie's World of Sport etc. was developed by Deric Botham, then editor of Penthouse magazine. The station garnered international publicity when it brought the former American prostitute Estella Marie Thompson, also known as Divine Brown, over for a launch at BAFTA's headquarters in Piccadilly. On Friday nights, DJ Chris Rogers (aka Caesar the Geezer) presented a live two-hour show with sports agent Eric Hall.

The channel broadcasts from 10.00pm until 5.30am. Its programmes are around 30 minutes in duration and include titles such as John Cherry: Soccer Stud, Council Estate Skanks, Charlie Britton Exposed (in which Charlie is played by Ben Dover), Diamond Geezers and Lara's Anal Adventures. The majority of programmes are heterosexual although some, such as All Girl Initiation, feature lesbianism and some, such as Ladyboy Training, cover transexualism. Some of the channel's programmes are pornographic spoofs on popular mainstream British television shows.

15th birthday
Television X celebrated its 15th birthday in August 2010 with a photo shoot of 14 of their top models from 1995 to then including Charmaine Sinclair, Lana Cox, Teresa May, Cathy Barry, Michelle Thorne, Lara Latex, Kerry Louise, Sasha Rose and Syren Sexton. They also held a large party to commemorate the event in central London at Café de Paris (London), which featured both strippers and burlesque acts throughout the evening.

Additional Networks
In addition to the standard Television X network, several additional networks were available on Sky UK.

Television X Amateur
Launched on 26 October 2003 as Television X 2. TVX 2 showcased viewer-sent videotapes of amateur pornography. By February 2007, the channel was briefly renamed Television X Raw but was soon reverted to its former name by October. During this period, the channel continued to focus on amateur tapes. In November 2008, the channel was renamed Television X Amateur (with an Orange colour scheme), once again with the same general focus, and closed in May 2012, when sister network Red Hot acquired its EPG slot.

Bangers
Launched on 26 October 2003 as Television X 3. TVX 3 was a movie channel that showed pornographic films, which at one point, aired the movies Debbie Does Dallas and Deep Throat. By February 2007, the channel was renamed as Television X Live before reverting to its former name by October. The programming transitioned to showcasing the Television X Callgirls Live chat program. In November 2008, the channel was renamed again to Television X Brits (with a Union Jack colour scheme), and changing its focus strictly on British pornography.

In 2016, Television X Brits was renamed as TVXXX, which was then renamed again to TVX Pornstars on March 29, 2017. In September 2017, TVX Pornstars was added to Virgin Media, replacing Xrated Couples.

On 24 April 2019, with changes on the Sky EPG slot, the channel was renamed to Bangers and moved from 911 to 903 on the EPG. On 30 September 2020, following the purchase of Portland TV by MG Global Entertainment, Bangers was removed, and its EPG slot was replaced with Babes and Brazzers.

Television X FFWD
Launched in February 2007 as Television Xtra before renaming as Television X 4 in October. The channel initially showcased pornography from continental Europe and the United States. After its renaming, a service called Television X FF (Fast Forward), which minimized non-pornographic content, was added. In November 2008, the channel was renamed Television X FFWD (with a Purple color scheme), before closing in May 2009, with its  electronic programme guide (EPG) slot being sold off.

Television X Pay-Per-Night
In August 2017, the Sky slot for Xrated Couples was replaced with a Television X channel called Television X Pay-Per Night, which was the first time a pay-per night channel was launched with the Television X brand.

In November 2017, a second Television X Pay-Per Night channel launched replacing Xrated Hook-Ups.

Television X HD
Since 2010, Television X has an Ofcom licence approved for an HD service.

The HD simulcast of Television X launched on 24 April 2019, being the first pornographic channel in the United Kingdom to broadcast in high-definition. TVX Pornstars was renamed to Bangers on the same day and both TVX Pay-Per-Night channels were removed. The SD feed relocated to channel 925 on Sky before being removed a week later on 2 May 2019.

The HD feed was very short-lived however, as the SD feed returned to Sky's EPG on 1 October 2019, closing the HD feed.

Television X Callgirls Live
Television X Callgirls Live was a televised sex line show broadcast on Television X 3 from 2005. The show was directed by Portway Productions and was produced by Ric Porter, who described it in his autobiography. It started with two "callgirls" (Avalon and Starr), but quickly grew to feature a number of different presenters. Original airtimes were between 10.00pm and 12.00pm but were subsequently changed to between 10.00pm and 2.00am. In August 2008, the show began broadcasting from 8.00pm showing softcore pornography until 10.00pm.

The show also ran on Television X 2 and Television X 4 from 9.00pm until 11.00pm (11.15pm on Friday and Saturday) and then continued on TVX4 for 15 minutes, after which it began broadcasting encrypted hardcore pornography (consistent with the R18 certificate). This section was used as a means of encouraging viewers to subscribe to the Television X package. The channel was also available online, it was significantly cheaper to call the premium-rate telephone number than other televised sex line channels.

Presenters and awards
Presenters contracted to Television X in 2008 included Suzie Best, Cathy Barry, Claire Grey (aka Jesse Jayne), Amber Leigh, Renee Richards, Keisha Kane, Cate Harrington, and Donna Marie. In March 2008, glamour model Sammie Pennington was introduced as the new face and body of Television X. Three months later, glamour model Sophie Price was introduced as the new face and body of Television X. In addition, Linsey Dawn McKenzie attended the 2008 UK Adult Film and Television Awards as a representative of Television X and Red Hot TV.

The channel won UK Adult Film and Television Awards 2008 Best Pay Per Night Adult Channel. The award was picked up by Linsey Dawn McKenzie. Additionally on the night of the awards Television X and Red Hot TV (UK) received more than 12 awards including Jay Snake winning best male and Cathy Barry winning best online female actress.

On 11 March 2010, Television X launched their own awards called the SHAFTAs (Soft and Hard Adult Film and Television Awards). Winners included Kerry Louise and Tanya Tate. Both Angel Long and Syren Sexton picked up 2 awards each.

On 3 December 2010, Television X won two awards from UK Adult Producers (UKAP). Tanya Tate collected the award on behalf of Television X for Tanya Tate's Sex Tour of Ireland which won Best Reality Series. She also starred in the Television X series Diamond Geezers, which won Best DVD.

Websites
In mid-2007, Television X launched TelevisionX WebTV. The BBFC and Ofcom censorship rules not applying in this domain allowed Television X to show hardcore content to its viewers for the first time. In October 2008, Television X launched TelevisionX.com this change effectively split the Television X website into two. One, televisionxnow.co.uk, to be used for television subscriptions and the other, Televisionx.com to be used for explicit content. This split was a necessity brought about by an Ofcom ruling which banned the advertisement of an explicit website on British television. Television X can only advertise their soft website on air.

The hardcore uncensored internet website features programmes from the Television X station. However, the camerawork, editing, performances and bad language are modified to include explicit representations of sexual intercourse.

See also
 List of adult television channels

References

External links
 

Television pornography
British pornographic television channels
Television channels and stations established in 1995
1995 establishments in the United Kingdom
Nudity in television